"Mamma Mia" is a song by the Swedish pop group ABBA, written by Benny Andersson, Björn Ulvaeus and Stig Anderson, with the lead vocals shared by Agnetha Fältskog and Anni-Frid Lyngstad. It is the opening track on the group's third album, the self-titled ABBA (1975). The song was released in September 1975 as its sixth single. The song's name is derived from Italian, where it is an interjection used in situations of surprise, anguish, or excitement. It corresponds to the English interjection "my, my!" (which can indeed be found in some lines within the song) but literally means "my mum". The song was ABBA's first number one in the UK since "Waterloo" in 1974.

History and impact
The distinctive sound at the start of the song is the marimba. According to biographer Carl Magnus Palm, the instrument was incorporated at the last minute, added after Benny Andersson found it in the studio and decided its "tick tock" rhythm was perfect for the track.

"Mamma Mia" was written at the home of Agnetha Fältskog and Björn Ulvaeus, and was the last track recorded for the album ABBA. It was one of four songs from the album to have a music video made to promote the album. Initially, however, "Mamma Mia" was never intended for release as a single. Around this time, many artists were recording ABBA songs (such as "Honey, Honey" and "Bang a Boomerang"), similarly ABBA offered "Mamma Mia" to British pop group Brotherhood of Man, who turned it down.

"I Do, I Do, I Do, I Do, I Do" topped the Australian charts for three weeks; however, the promo clip for "Mamma Mia" proved the more popular after repeat screenings on Australian television, notably Countdown. ABBA's Australian record company, RCA, asked that "Mamma Mia" be released as a single but Polar Music refused. However, Stig Anderson agreed to this; "Mamma Mia" was released in Australia in August 1975, where it spent 10 weeks at number one.  Cash Box said the single was "an example of [ABBA's] excellent musical taste," stating that the "tune is upbeat, with characteristically varied textures."

After this success in Australia, Epic Records in the United Kingdom took notice of ABBA for the first time since their Eurovision Song Contest winner "Waterloo". From then on, Epic began to heavily promote ABBA's singles with the immediate result of "S.O.S." reaching the Top 10 in the British market, their first hit since "Waterloo". "Mamma Mia" soon followed, reaching number one in the UK Singles Chart in January 1976, the second of ABBA's 18 consecutive Top 10 singles there.

Record World said that "the reason [the song is a worldwide smash] should be self-explanatory after just one listen."

The B-side for the Australian release of "Mamma Mia" was "Hey, Hey Helen". In most other countries the B-side was the instrumental "Intermezzo Number 1". ABBA's British label Epic selected "Tropical Loveland" as the B-side for the UK release, believing another vocal track, especially one showcasing ABBA in a different musical style, would better promote the parent album.

"Mamma Mia" is widely considered to be one of ABBA's best songs. In 2017, Billboard ranked the song number seven on their list of the 15 greatest ABBA songs, and in 2021, Rolling Stone ranked the song number five on their list of the 25 greatest ABBA songs.

As of September 2021, it is ABBA's seventh-biggest song in the UK with 860,000 chart sales (pure sales and digital streams).

Track listings

International single

UK single

Personnel
Anni-Frid Lyngstad – lead and backing vocals
Agnetha Fältskog – lead and backing vocals
 Björn Ulvaeus – rhythm guitar and backing vocals
 Benny Andersson – piano, marimba, Hammond organ and backing vocals
 Janne Schaffer – lead guitar
 Mike Watson – bass guitar
 Roger Palm – drums

Charts

Weekly charts

Year-end charts

Certifications and sales

A-Teens version

"Mamma Mia" is the debut single of Swedish pop group A-Teens. It was released on 30 April 1999 by Stockholm Records as the first single from their debut album, The ABBA Generation (1999). The song is a cover of the popular hit by ABBA.

Upon its release, it became a smash hit in Sweden, where it peaked at number one and stayed there for eight consecutive weeks, earning a quadruple platinum certification.

On initial pressings of the single, the name of the band appeared as ABBA-Teens, but Stockholm Records thought it would be better to change the name of the band to A-Teens, so new pressings of the single were made.

Commercial performance
The single reached the top 20 in several European countries, reaching number three in Norway, number nine in Switzerland and the Netherlands, number 10 in Germany, number 12 in the United Kingdom, and number 14 in Austria and Finland. A Spanish version of the song was recorded for promotion in Latin America and Spain. Despite the worldwide success, the song failed to attract the Australian public, peaking at 72 on the ARIA Singles Chart, although it did reach number 13 in New Zealand.

In the United States, the single peaked at 63 on the Billboard Hot Single Sales Chart, becoming the band's first single to chart in the country.

Music video
The accompanying music video was directed by Henrik Sylvén and was filmed in Sweden. It shows the A-Teens as waiters at an art exposition, and they are suppressed by the manager; but soon they discover that one of the paintings transports them to a party where the manager and patrons he's helping also join in on the fun.

Track listings

 European CD single
 "Mamma Mia" (radio version) – 3:43
 "Mamma Mia" (extended version) – 5:48

 European maxi-CD single and Australian CD single
 "Mamma Mia" (radio version) – 3:43
 "Mamma Mia" (Giuseppe remix) – 5:35
 "Mamma Mia" (Jam Lab remix) – 3:56
 "Mamma Mia" (extended version) – 5:48

 UK CD1
 "Mamma Mia" (radio version) – 3:45
 "Lay All Your Love on Me" – 4:04
 "Mamma Mia" (karaoke version) – 3:45
 "Mamma Mia" (CD-ROM video)

 UK CD2
 "Mamma Mia" (extended version) – 5:48
 "Mamma Mia" (The Bold & The Beautiful Glamourmix edit) – 3:46
 "Mamma Mia" (Trouser Enthusiasts' Undying dub) – 9:20

 UK cassette single
 "Mamma Mia" (radio version) – 3:45
 "Mamma Mia" (karaoke version) – 3:45

 US CD and cassette single
 "Mamma Mia" (album version) – 3:43
 "Mamma Mia" (extended version) – 5:48

Charts

Weekly charts

Year-end charts

Certifications

Release history

Mamma Mia! version
"Mamma Mia" was recorded by Meryl Streep for the soundtrack of Mamma Mia!. Her version was released on 8 July 2008 alongside the rest of the soundtrack, by Decca and Polydor Records. It was produced by Benny Andersson.

Charts

Certifications

Mamma Mia! Here We Go Again version
Lily James, Jessica Keenan Wynn and Alexa Davies recorded "Mamma Mia" for the soundtrack of Mamma Mia! Here We Go Again. Their version was released on 13 July 2018 alongside the rest of the soundtrack, by Capitol and Polydor Records. It was produced by Benny Andersson.

Charts

Certifications

References and appearances in other media
In 1980, a Spanish version of "Mamma Mia" was included on the album Gracias Por La Música.
In 1999, a musical with the same name, Mamma Mia! (with an exclamation point to differentiate its name from the title track), opened in London's West End, featuring many of ABBA's songs and production has spread to many other countries, with more than 5,000 performances on Broadway alone. A film adaptation premiered in theaters in 2008.
ABBA perform parts of the song live in the film ABBA: The Movie (1977).
The song is featured in the movie The Adventures of Priscilla, Queen of the Desert (1993) which was made in Australia, the site of the single's greatest success.
The song can be heard in another Australian film Muriel's Wedding (1994).
The song can be heard in the That '70s Show episode "No Quarter". Jackie plays it trying to get to sleep, to the annoyance of Donna.
In a second-season episode of the television drama Boston Legal, the character Ivan Tiggs, performed by Tom Selleck references the song in reaction to his fiancé's breaking into a line from Dancing Queen.
 The A-Teens cover is used as the opening theme of the German reality programme Frauentausch.
 On 5 December 2010, on a British poll of the nation's favourite ABBA song, the song was placed at number 6.
 Aus TV series sent up this video in their second season in 1990 with Jane Turner and Gina Riley in the roles of Agnetha and Anni-Frid, respectively.
 Cher recorded the song for her ABBA cover album "Dancing Queen".
 In 2019 Josh Turner Guitar released a YouTube cover of the ABBA song "Mama Mia" with Joshua Lee Turner as vocalist and banjo player? ... Banjo Player! and Carson Mckee playing acoustic guitar and singing backup vocals.  This popular video has over 1 million views
 In 2018, Austin Weber uploaded his cover of the song on Youtube where he remade the song with a synth keyboard, recorded his own vocals and danced to them while in Kyoto, Japan. This popular cover would go on to get over 9.3 million views.
In 2020, Gabi DeMartino covered the song, in a medley along with "The Name Of The Game" titled "Mamma Mia 2 Medley" on her debut extended play, Gabroadway.

References

1975 singles
1975 songs
1976 singles
1999 singles
ABBA songs
A-Teens songs
Atlantic Records singles
Epic Records singles
Irish Singles Chart number-one singles
Music videos directed by Lasse Hallström
MCA Records singles
Number-one singles in Australia
Number-one singles in Denmark
Number-one singles in Germany
Number-one singles in Sweden
Number-one singles in Switzerland
Polar Music singles
Polydor Records singles
RCA Records singles
Songs written by Benny Andersson and Björn Ulvaeus
Stockholm Records singles
UK Singles Chart number-one singles